The Grendel R31 is a semi-automatic carbine by Grendel Inc. that is chambered in .22 Winchester Magnum cartridge and is fed via 30-round, detachable box magazine that is housed in the pistol grip. The carbine has a skeleton butt that can be extended using the two tubes that are housed on either side of the receiver. Most are equipped with a muzzle brake and telescopic sight.

See also
 Grendel P30

Semi-automatic rifles of the United States